Christian Lucien Laflamme (born November 24, 1976) is a Canadian former professional ice hockey defenceman. He played parts of eight seasons in the National Hockey League between 1996 and 2004.

Biography
As a youth, Laflamme played in the 1989 and 1990 Quebec International Pee-Wee Hockey Tournaments with a minor ice hockey team from Rive-Sud. Laflamme was selected in the second round of the 1995 NHL Entry Draft, 45th overall, by the Chicago Blackhawks, after a successful junior career in the Quebec Major Junior Hockey League.

Laflamme started his NHL career with the Blackhawks before being dealt to the Edmonton Oilers in a trade that saw Boris Mironov join the Blackhawks. Laflamme spent less than a calendar year in Edmonton before being traded to the Montreal Canadiens. After two seasons in Montreal with limited playing time, Laflamme signed as a free agent with the St. Louis Blues, where he has split time between the NHL and the American Hockey League.

Career statistics

Regular season and playoffs

Transactions
8 July 1995 - Laflamme drafted by Chicago.
20 March 1999 - Laflamme is dealt by Chicago, along with Daniel Cleary, Ethan Moreau and Chad Kilger to Edmonton in exchange for Boris Mironov, Dean McAmmond and Jonas Elofsson.
9 March 2000 - Laflamme is traded by Edmonton to Montreal, along with Matthieu Descoteaux in exchange for Igor Ulanov and Alain Nasreddine.
21 August 2001 - Laflamme signs with St. Louis.

References

External links

1976 births
Beauport Harfangs players
Canadian ice hockey defencemen
Chicago Blackhawks draft picks
Chicago Blackhawks players
Edmonton Oilers players
French Quebecers
Ice hockey people from Quebec
Kassel Huskies players
Living people
Montreal Canadiens players
Nürnberg Ice Tigers players
People from Chaudière-Appalaches
Pont Rouge Lois Jeans players
St. Louis Blues players
Sinupret Ice Tigers players
Verdun Collège Français players
Worcester IceCats players
Canadian expatriate ice hockey players in Germany